The Pitcairn Building, also known as the Pittsburgh Plate Glass Company Building, is a historic warehouse and light manufacturing loft building located at 1027 Arch Street at the corner of N. 11th Street in the Chinatown neighborhood of Philadelphia, Pennsylvania. It was designed by noted Philadelphia architects G. W. & W. D. Hewitt and built in 1901. It is an eight-story, steel frame building clad in brick and granite with terra cotta details. The building measures approximately 74 feet wide and 172 feet deep.  It was originally built as a regional distribution center for the Pittsburgh Plate Glass Company.  It later housed a clothing manufacturer, H. Daroff and Sons, who originated the "Botany 500" brand.

It was added to the National Register of Historic Places in 1988.

See also

National Register of Historic Places listings in Center City, Philadelphia

References
Notes

External links

Industrial buildings and structures on the National Register of Historic Places in Philadelphia
Industrial buildings completed in 1901
Chinatown, Philadelphia
National Register of Historic Places in Philadelphia
PPG Industries